Autumn Blood is a 2013 English-language Austrian thriller drama film directed by Markus Blunder and starring Sophie Lowe.

Premise
A mother and her two children, an older sister and a younger brother, witness how a man shoots their husband and father. The traumatized boy does not speak ever since. The children grow up and the girl becomes a beautiful young woman, who attracts the attention of some local men. One of them, the son of the man who killed her father, rapes her at a pool in the mountains, while at their home the boy finds that their mother has died in her bed. A while later, the men come to the house of the children and one of them rapes the girl again. After they find that a social worker makes inquiries about the girl at the local post office, where the girl collected welfare instead of her deceased mother, the men come to the house with rifles, apparently to kill the girl and boy. After a hunt, in which one of the men falls to his death and another is killed by his friend, the father kills his son right before he would shoot the girl. He then offers the girl his rifle to shoot him, but she refuses to do so.

Cast
Sophie Lowe as The Girl
Maximilian Harnisch as The Boy
Peter Stormare as The Mayor
Samuel Vauramo as The Hunter
Gustaf Skarsgård as The Butcher
Tim Morten Uhlenbrock as The Friend
Annica McCrudden as The Social Worker
George Lenz as The Clerk
Nelly Gschwandtner as The Hunter's Wife
Julia Dietze as The Butcher's Wife
Hansa Czypionka as The Priest
Jonas Laux as The Father
Jacqueline Le Saunier as The Mother 
Hannah Payr as Young Girl
Elias Köfler as Young Boy
Margarete Tiesel as Village Woman

Reception
The film received a 20% rating on Rotten Tomatoes.

References

External links
 
 

2013 films
English-language Austrian films
Austrian thriller drama films
Films about rape
2013 thriller drama films
2010s survival films
2013 drama films
2010s English-language films